KC, Kc and similar may refer to:

Places
 Kuçovë District, Albania's ISO 3166-2 code
 Kansas City metropolitan area, a major metropolitan area of the United States
 Kansas City, Missouri, its principal city
 Kansas City, Kansas, the third-largest city in the region
 Karachay-Cherkessia, Russia's ISO 3166-2 code

People
 Kent Cochrane (1951–2014), Canadian memory disorder patient
 KC Concepcion (born 1985), Philippine model, actress, singer, songwriter
 Kcee (musician) (born 1979), Nigerian singer, songwriter, performer
 K.C. Potter (born 1939), American academic administrator and LGBT rights activist
 Harry Wayne Casey (born 1951), American musician best known for his band KC and the Sunshine Band
 KC or K.C., an abbreviation for the Nepalese surname Khatri (Khatri Chhetri)

Arts and entertainment
 KC (album), a 2010 album by KC Concepcion
 KC and the Sunshine Band, an American funk, R&B and disco musical group founded in 1973
 King Crimson, a British progressive rock band
 K.C. Guthrie, a fictional character in Degrassi: The Next Generation
 KaibaCorp, a fictional gaming company in Yu-Gi-Oh!

Businesses and organizations

Schools and universities
 King's College, Hong Kong, a boys' secondary school in Hong Kong
 Kingwood College, now Lone Star College-Kingwood, in Kingwood, Houston, Texas, United States
 Kishinchand Chellaram College or K. C. College, South Mumbai, India
 Kutama College, a boys' boarding high school in Zimbabwe
 Kuen Cheng High School, a high school in Malaysia

Sports organizations
 Kansas City Chiefs, a National Football League team based in Kansas City, Missouri
 Kansas City Royals, a Major League Baseball team based in Kansas City, Missouri
 Sporting Kansas City or Sporting KC, a Major League Soccer team based in Kansas City, Kansas

Other businesses and organizations
 KC HiLiTES, a US manufacturer of driving lights
 Kimberly-Clark, a US personal care corporation
 The Kennel Club, a dog-breed registry in England
 Kingston Communications, a UK communications and IT service provider
 Air Astana (IATA airline designator)

Science and technology
 Kc, the equilibrium constant, the equilibrium of a chemical reaction
 CXCL1 or KC, a cytokine 
 Keratoconus, a degenerative eye disease
 Kilocycle, as in 1,000 cycles per second, with the modern equivalent being kilohertz

Other uses
 KC Stadium, a former name of a football and rugby-league stadium in Hull, England
 Kelly criterion, a formula in probability theory and finance
 King's Counsel, a legal position in Commonwealth countries
 KC, an obsolete postnominal for Knight of the Order of the Crescent

See also
 Kansas City (disambiguation)
 Casey (disambiguation)